Olivier Charroin and Stéphane Robert were the defending champions but decided not to participate this year.
Radu Albot and Teymuraz Gabashvili won the title by defeating Adam Pavlásek and Jiří Veselý 7–5, 5–7, [10–8] in the final.

Seeds

Draw

Draw

References
 Main Draw

Prosperita Open - Doubles
2012 Doubles